The 2013–14 Kent Invicta Football League season was the third in the history of the Kent Invicta Football League, a football competition in England.

League table

The league featured 13 clubs which competed in the division last season, along with two new clubs:
Fleet Leisure, promoted from the Kent County Football League
Glebe, promoted from the Kent County Youth League

Also Meridian S & S changed their name to Meridian VP.

League table

Results

References

External links
 Kent Invicta Football League

Kent Invicta Football League seasons
10